John O'Brien (8 October 1931 – 13 May 2020) was an Australian water polo player. He competed at the 1956 Summer Olympics and the 1960 Summer Olympics. In 2010, he was inducted into the Water Polo Australia Hall of Fame.

References

External links
 

1931 births
2020 deaths
Sportspeople from Melbourne
Australian male water polo players
Olympic water polo players of Australia
Water polo players at the 1956 Summer Olympics
Water polo players at the 1960 Summer Olympics
Australian water polo coaches